Ingrid Marga Irene Lutz (3 March 1924 – 13 November 2021) was a German film actress. Lutz died on 13 November 2021, at the age of 97.

Selected filmography
 I Entrust My Wife to You (1943)
 Young Hearts (1944)
 Tell the Truth (1946)
 Thank You, I'm Fine (1948)
 Friday the Thirteenth (1949)
 Furioso (1950)
 Until We Meet Again (1952)
 That Can Happen to Anyone (1952)
 Big City Secret (1952)
 Aunt Jutta from Calcutta (1953)
 Hooray, It's a Boy! (1953)
 Knall and Fall as Detectives (1953)
 Captain Wronski (1954)
 Ball of Nations (1954)
 School for Marriage (1954)
 Homesick for Germany (1954)
 Father's Day (1955)
 The Major and the Bulls (1955)
 The Double Husband (1955)
 Doctor Bertram (1957)

References

Bibliography

External links

1924 births
2021 deaths
Actresses from Berlin
German film actresses